François-Joseph Bérardier de Bataut (Paris 1720 – Paris 1794) was a French teacher, writer and translator living in the Age of Enlightenment.

Biography 

François-Joseph Bérardier de Bataut is born in Paris in 1720. Having studied theology, he became professor of rhetoric at the Collège du Plessis a part of the University of Paris.  He is the author, notably, of a Précis de l'histoire universelle (Treaty of Universal History) which was very much appreciated by his contemporaries, and of the Essai sur le récit (Essay on Narrative), a fictional dialogue on how to tell good stories, as well as the translator of Melchior de Polignac's L'Anti-Lucrèce.

Works 
 Précis de l'histoire universelle, Paris : Hérissant fils, 1766, in-8°, XII-383 p. (A second edition is published by C.-P. Berton in 1776, and a third one, "revue, corrigée et augmentée" by Charles-Constant Letellier in 1823.) 
 Essai sur le récit, ou Entretiens sur la manière de raconter, par M. l'abbé Bérardier de Bataut, Paris : C.-P. Berton, 1776, in-12°, X-725 p. (There is a commented electronic edition by Christof Schöch, www.berardier.org, 2010.)
 L'Anti-Lucrèce en vers françois, translated by François-Joseph Bérardier de Bataut, Paris : C.-P. Berton, 1786. (The original version was written in Latin by Melchior de Polignac (1661–1744) and was first published posthumously in 1747 ; it was a great success and was frequently translated into French during the 18th century.)

Secondary sources

Biographical articles 

Note that some biographical articles dating back to the beginning of the 19th century confuse François-Joseph Bérardier de Bataut and the abbot Denis Bérardier. The following list only indicates reliable sources.

 Art. " Bérardier de Bataut (François-Joseph) ", in: Les siècles littéraires de la France, ou nouveau dictionnaire historique, critique et bibliographique, par N. L. M. Desessarts, Paris : Desessarts, an VIII (1800), p. 221.
 Art. « Bérardier de Bataut (François-Joseph) », in: Dictionnaire universel, historique, critique et bibliographique, neuvième édition, Paris : Prudhomme fils, 1812, tome XIX, supplément, p. 61. 
 Art. « Bérardier de Bataut (François-Joseph) », in: Examen critique et complément des dictionnaires historiques les pas répandus, par Antoine-Alexandre Barbier. Paris : Rey et Gravier, 1820, p. 100–101.
 Art. « Bérardier de Bataut (François-Joseph) », in : Dictionnaire des lettres françaises : Le XVIIIe siècle, nouvelle édition sous la direction de François Moureau, Paris : Le Livre de poche, 1995, p. 173.

Contemporary reviews of Bérardiers works 

 (Anon.), « Lettre VI : Essai sur le récit », in: L’Année littéraire 6, 1776, p. 121–137 
 (Anon.), « Essai sur le récit », in: Journal encyclopédique 8, 1776, p. 273–286. 
 (Anon.), « Lettre III : L'Anti-Lucrèce en vers françois, par M. l'Abbé Bérardier de Bataut, in: L’Année littéraire 6, 1786, p. 46–63.

Critical analyses  
 Adam, Jean-Michel, « L'Analyse linguistique du récit : rhétorique, poétique et pragmatique textuelle », in: Zeitschrift für französische Sprache und Literatur, 100, 1990, p. 7–24.
 Albertan(-Coppola), Sylviane, « La poésie au service de l'apologétique. L'Anti-Lucrèce en vers français de Bérardier de Bataut », in : Cahiers Roucher-André Chénier 10–11, 1990–1991, p. 137–148.
 Sgard, Jean. « Poétique des vies particulières », in: Les Vies de Voltaire : discours et représentations biographiques, XVIIIe-XXIe siècles, ed. Christophe Cave & Simon Davies. Oxford : Voltaire Foundation, SVEC 2008:4, 2008, p. 29–41.  (The section 'Poétique du récit' is devoted almost exclusively to the Essai sur le récit.)

External links 
 
 www.berardier.org: dossier on Bérardier de Bataut and an online edition of the Essai sur le récit.

1720 births
1794 deaths
University of Paris alumni
Academic staff of the University of Paris
Writers from Paris
French literary critics
18th-century French writers
18th-century French male writers
18th-century French historians
French male non-fiction writers